Charles Barnard may refer to:

 Charles Barnard (castaway) (1781–1840), American castaway
 Charles Barnard (American football) (1915–2008), American football end
 Charles A. Barnard (American football) (1880–1977), American football player and coach
 Charles A. Barnard (politician) (1907–1956), member of the Wisconsin State Assembly
 Charles R. Barnard (1883–1948), member of the Wisconsin State Assembly
 C. D. Barnard (1895–1971), British pilot

See also
 Charles Bernard (disambiguation)